Chromolepis is a genus of flowering plants in the family Asteraceae.

There is only one known species, Chromolepis heterophylla, endemic to Mexico (States of México and Michoacán).

References

Monotypic Asteraceae genera
Heliantheae
Endemic flora of Mexico